Michelangelo Mattei or Michael Angelus Matthaeius (8 May 1628 – 22 December 1699) was a Roman Catholic prelate who served as Titular Patriarch of Antioch (1693–1699) and Titular Archbishop of Hadrianopolis in Haemimonto (1689–1693).

Biography
Michelangelo Mattei was born in Rome, Italy on 8 May 1628.
On 7 November 1689, he was appointed during the papacy of Pope Alexander VIII as Titular Archbishop of Hadrianopolis in Haemimonto.
On 13 November 1689, he was consecrated bishop by Fabrizio Spada, Cardinal-Priest of San Crisogono with Francesco de' Marini, Titular Archbishop of Teodosia, and Prospero Bottini, Titular Archbishop of Myra, serving as co-consecrators.
On 18 May 1693, he was appointed during the papacy of Pope Innocent XII as Titular Patriarch of Antioch.
He served as Titular Patriarch of Antioch until his death on 22 December 1699.

Episcopal succession

References

External links and additional sources
 (for Chronology of Bishops) 
 (for Chronology of Bishops) 
 (for Chronology of Bishops) 
 (for Chronology of Bishops) 

17th-century Roman Catholic titular bishops
Bishops appointed by Pope Alexander VIII
Bishops appointed by Pope Innocent XII
1628 births
1699 deaths